Scarborough Convent School, also known as The Convent of the Ladies of Mary Grammar School and many variations, was a girls' school in Scarborough, North Yorkshire, England, from  1882 until 1975.

The school was founded by a Belgian order of nuns, the Daughters of Joseph and Mary, who had established their first English school, Coloma Convent Girls' School which is still open, in Croydon in 1869.

An 1890 directory of Scarborough said:

and a 1919 Register of Catholic Colleges and Schools in The Tablet lists it as:

The school operated from two sites, with the younger pupils based at a building in South Cliff and the seniors based at the convent in Queen Street. Some girls were boarders, and there were about 300 pupils before it closed.

In 1975 the school closed and its main building was sold to North Yorkshire County Council, initially used as premises for some students of the Graham School and later developed as housing for the elderly, named "Maria's Court". A statue of the Sacred Heart was rescued from the school site and moved to St Augustine's Catholic School in the town.

Archaeologists investigated the former school site between 1996 and 1999, and found medieval and Roman material.

Notable former pupils
Susan Hill (born 1942), writer
Sonya Leydecker (born 1954), Global Head of dispute resolution at Herbert Smith Freehills
Nadine Senior (1939-2016), founder of Northern School of Contemporary Dance
Judy Gridley (1946-1987), actress playing Elaine Webster in  Coronation Street 1984-1985

References

Defunct Catholic schools in the Diocese of Middlesbrough
Defunct grammar schools in England
Defunct schools in North Yorkshire
Educational institutions established in 1882
Educational institutions disestablished in 1975
Schools in Scarborough, North Yorkshire
1882 establishments in England